Resurrection of the Widow of Nain's Son is an oil painting on canvas painted by Paolo Veronese ca. 1565–1570. Initially in Bartolomeo della Nave's collection, it was acquired in 1659 by Archduke Leopold Wilhelm of Austria and is now in the Kunsthistorisches Museum in Vienna (catalogue number GG 52).

It depicts the raising of the son of the widow of Nain, showing her and her friends in aristocratic Venetian dresses of the time and Jesus standing in front of a colonnade akin to those on contemporary theatrical scenery.

References

1570 paintings
Paintings by Paolo Veronese
Paintings in the collection of the Kunsthistorisches Museum
Paintings depicting Jesus
Paintings based on the Gospels
Paintings of apostles
Paintings depicting Saint Peter